Santosh Mishra (born 24 August 1978) is a Bhojpuri film director, writer and music composer, known for his works in Hindi, Bhojpuri and Gujarati films. He is known for directing the Bhojpuri movies like Patna Se Pakistan, Bam Bam Bol Raha Hai Kashi, Mokama 0 km, Border, Nirahua Rickshawala 2 and more than 40 other films.

Filmography

References

External links

 

1978 births
Living people
Indian male screenwriters
Hindi-language lyricists
Hindi-language film directors
Bhojpuri-language film directors
21st-century Indian film directors
Indian television directors
Film directors from Mumbai
Hindi film producers